Seaton Delaval Hall is a Grade I listed country house in Northumberland, England, near the coast just north of Newcastle upon Tyne. Located between Seaton Sluice and Seaton Delaval, it was designed by Sir John Vanbrugh in 1718 for Admiral George Delaval; it is now owned by the National Trust.

Since completion of the house in 1728, it has had an unfortunate history. Neither architect nor patron lived to see its completion; it then passed through a succession of heirs, being lived in only intermittently. Most damaging of all, in 1822 the central block was gutted by fire, and has remained an empty shell ever since.

The 18th-century gardens of the hall are Grade II* listed on the Register of Historic Parks and Gardens.

History 
The Delaval family had owned the estate since the time of the Norman Conquest. Admiral George Delaval bought the estate from an impoverished kinsman, Sir John Delaval in 1717. George Delaval had made his fortune from capturing prize ships while in the Navy, and had also served as a British envoy during the reign of Queen Anne. In 1718, he called on architect Sir John Vanbrugh to advise him on how to modernise and enhance the existing mansion. Upon viewing the site, Vanbrugh felt he could do nothing, and advised complete demolition of all except the ancient chapel near to the mansion, which is now the parish church of Our Lady.

His advice was taken and the construction work was completed in 1728, two years after the death of the Admiral. The resulting new mansion was the last country house Vanbrugh designed, and it is regarded as one of his finest works. On completion, the Admiral's nephew Francis Blake Delaval (the elder) inherited the property, and moved in immediately.

In 1775, the Newcastle portrait artist William Bell made two paintings of the Hall, depicting the north and south fronts with some artistic license, including wings that were never actually constructed. Bell also painted portraits of many of the residents of the house at the time, earning him the patronage of Lord Delaval, a younger son of the above-mentioned Francis Blake Delaval. These paintings can still be seen in the Hall.

In 1822, the central block was gutted by a fire said to have been caused by jackdaws nesting in the chimneys of the section of the south-east wing closest to the main house. This wing was subsequently demolished, and various charred openings can still be seen, now glazed, showing where it joined the central block.

The house was partially restored by the architect John Dobson in 1862–63, when the central block was re-roofed, although it remained a shell internally.

During the Second World War the Hall was used to house German prisoners-of-war, who worked as labourers on neighbouring farms.

More modern times
Further restoration was completed in 1959 and the early 1960s, including replacement of windows in the central block, restoration of the upstairs gallery in the main hall, and paving of the floors on the piano nobile.

From 1968 to 1984 "medieval banquets" were held in the original kitchen of the hall.

However, the house was to remain unoccupied until the 1980s when, after a period of 160 years, Edward Delaval Henry Astley, 22nd Baron Hastings moved into the west wing. It became his permanent home until his death in 2007.

Subsequently, the new 23rd Baron Hastings, Delaval Astley, wishing to preserve the future of the Hall and encourage greater public access, began discussions with the National Trust. On 1 September 2008 the National Trust launched an appeal for £6.3m to bring the hall, with its gardens and grounds, into the Trust's custody. In December 2009, the Trust announced that its appeal had been successful, and the purchase having gone through, the Hall opened to visitors again on 1 May 2010.

In October 2021, Seaton Delaval Hall was one of 142 sites across England to receive part of a £35-million injection into the government's Culture Recovery Fund, specifically for its sea-walk walls and corbels.

Architecture and layout

The style of architecture is known as English Baroque, based on the Palladian style introduced into the UK by Inigo Jones. Vanbrugh developed the style from the more decorated and architecturally lighter continental baroque popular in Europe.

The design is of a centre block portico, or corps de logis, containing the state and principal rooms, between two flanking wings. The wings have a centre projection of three bays, crowned by a pediment, either side of which are 7 bays of sash windows above a ground floor arcade.

The west wing originally housed secondary and service accommodation. Damaged in an earlier fire but restored to the original plan, it is distinguished by a great colonnade and boasted a lofty vaulted kitchen, now a salon. The east wing contains the stables, a sixty-foot chamber of palatial design, with stalls and mangers of stone fit. They were reportedly inspired by the stables at Hopetoun House near Edinburgh, designed by Robert Adam. In 1768 Sir Francis Blake Delaval wrote thus to his brother: "I am putting up the grand stable on a plan we saw at Lord Hoptoun's when we were in Scotland, with stone divisions of the stalls." So pleased was he with the results that Sir Francis held a dinner party in the new stables.

While the exterior is still a perfect example of English baroque at its finest, the interiors of the state rooms remain unrestored from the fire.

Also in the  estate park is a stone mausoleum, about half a mile east of the hall, which once had a majestic dome, now gone, but which retains a portico resting on huge monolithic columns. The mausoleum is surrounded by a circular ha-ha, a stone-faced ditch. It was erected by Lord Delaval to his only son, John, who died in 1775 aged 19, "as a result of having been kicked in a vital organ by a laundry maid to whom he was paying his addresses". No-one was ever buried in the mausoleum, which was never consecrated, and the unfortunate John Delaval was buried in St Peter's Doddington, Lincolnshire.

The mausoleum is now ruinous and its lead roof has gone. Also to the east in the walled garden is a south-facing orangery, designed by the architect William Etty, who collaborated with Vanbrugh. It has five glazed arches separated by Doric demi-columns. The statue in the forecourt in front of the house is a lead figure of David, with empty sling, lightly poised above the crouching form of Goliath, who has his thumbs doubled inside his palms. This is an 18th-century copy, possibly by John Cheere, of a 16th-century Italian marble by either Baccio Bandinelli or a follower of Giambologna. The statue has been repositioned from one of the corner bastions of the garden.

A large obelisk commands the fields to the south of the hall; the stub of a second can be found on the north side of the road running past the hall, next to the turning for New Hartley. This second obelisk marked the site where Admiral George Delaval was killed in a fall from his horse in 1723, before his new hall had been completed. Only the pedestal of the obelisk survives, half-hidden by trees; it is uninscribed.

From the steps of the house on a clear day, The Cheviot and Hedgehope Hill can be clearly seen on the northern horizon, some forty miles away on the Scottish border. Also visible to the northwest are the Simonside Hills.

Legend 
As with many big old houses, Seaton Delaval Hall is alleged to have a ghost. According to family biographer Francis Askham:

There is a first-floor window on the North front of Seaton Delaval where, so it would seem from one particular part of the forecourt, a white-clad figure is standing. This, according to legend, is the White Lady, a girl who fell in love with the Delaval heir and died of a broken heart because the marriage was forbidden.

Closures
Seaton Delaval Hall in its entirety was closed to visitors in 2018 on account of building work. It re-opened on Saturday 16 February 2019, from Thursdays to Sundays only. In 2020 the Hall closed again to visitors on account of the COVID-19 pandemic. The gardens re-opened in late July to visitors who had pre-booked their tickets.

In summer 2021 the Central Hall and Stables and repaved Basement, and the new Brewhouse Café, re-opened without the requirement to book tickets in advance. The West Wing re-opened to visitors in May 2022. A small stage has been erected in the former kitchen to mark the Delaval family's theatricality; other exhibits, such as a room with furniture hanging from the ceiling, commemorate their love of practical jokes.

See also 
Blenheim Palace (also by Vanbrugh)
Castle Howard (also by Vanbrugh)
Bavington Hall, Northumberland (bought by George Delaval in the eighteenth century)
Dissington Hall, west of Newcastle (a previous seat of the Delaval family)
Doddington Hall, Lincolnshire (which retains other Delaval family portraits)
Ford Castle, Northumberland (owned by the Delaval family in the eighteenth century)
Dilkusha Kothi (constructed in around 1800 on the banks of the Gomti near Lucknow in India for Gore Ouseley, and of very similar design to Seaton Delaval Hall; it now lies in ruins)

Gallery

References
"Education Committee of the County of Northumberland as a memento of the Coronation of Her Majesty Queen Elizabeth II and a reminder of your loyalty to Her Majesty and to the beautiful County of Northumberland." 1953

External links

 National Trust Seaton Delaval Hall
 SeatonDelaval.org.uk
 SeatonDelaval.org
 Photos of Seaton Delaval Hall

Houses completed in 1728
Country houses in Northumberland
John Vanbrugh buildings
English Baroque architecture
Grade I listed buildings in Northumberland
National Trust properties in Northumberland
Historic house museums in Northumberland
Gardens in Northumberland
1728 establishments in England
Grade I listed houses
Grade II* listed parks and gardens in Northumberland